Tiidu may refer to several places in Estonia:
Tiidu, Valga County, village in Estonia
Tiidu, Võru County, village in Estonia